National Testing Agency (NTA) is an Indian government agency that has been approved by the Union Council of Ministers and established in November 2017 to conduct entrance examinations for educational institutions. The government appointed Vineet Joshi as the first Director-General of the agency. NTA is responsible for 
Joint Entrance Examination – Main (JEE Main), National Eligibility cum Entrance Test-Undergraduate (NEET UG), National Eligibility Test (NET), Common Management Admission Test (CMAT), Graduate Pharmacy Aptitude Test (GPAT), Common University Entrance Test (CUET) and All India Ayush Post Graduate Entrance Test (AIAPGET).

History
The roots of the agency can be traced to the Programme of Action 1992, related to National Policy of Education 1986, which mentioned conducting national level common entrance tests to professional and non-professional programmes of study. Its actual start was in 2010 with a report submitted to the Ministry of Human Resources Development (MHRD) by a committee consisting of some of the directors of the Indian Institutes of Technology (IITs), which recommended that the national testing agency be "created by an Act of Parliament". The report mentioned that a statutory agency can ensure independence and transparency in testing of the magnitude that is being envisaged. In 2013 the MHRD constituted a seven member task force to "prepare a blue print for creating a special purpose vehicle to take the concept of National Testing Agency (NTA) forward". This was following a decision made in April 2013 to set up the agency. In 2017 an announcement about NTA was made by the Finance Minister in the budget speech of 2017, and this was followed by cabinet approval.

On 7 July 2018, Union HRD Minister Prakash Javadekar stated during a press conference that the NTA will be holding the Joint Entrance Examination – Main (JEE Main) and the National Eligibility cum Entrance Test-Undergraduate (NEET UG) twice a year, and will also be holding National Eligibility Test (NET), Common Management Admission Test (CMAT) and Graduate Pharmacy Aptitude Test (GPAT).

Finance 

Members and their nature  

The administration of the NTA has been entrusted to the Governing Body.

Examinations conducted by NTA 

NTA conducts the following examinations.

All India Sainik School Entrance Examination (AISSEE)
Babasaheb Bhimrao Ambedkar University Entrance Test
Banaras Hindu University Entrance Test
Common Management Admission Test (CMAT) CMAT
 Common University Entrance Test(CUET) for Under-Graduate (UG) and Post-Graduate (PG) CUET (UG) CUET (PG)
Graduate Pharmacy Aptitude Test (GPAT) GPAT
ICAR's All India Entrance Exam for Admission (AIEEA)
IGNOU PhD and OPENMAT (MBA) Entrance Examination
Indian Institute of Foreign Trade Entrance Examination
Jawaharlal Nehru University Entrance Examination (JNUEE)
Joint Entrance Examination – Main (JEE Main) JEE (Main)
National Council for Hotel Management Joint Entrance Examination (NCHM JEE)
 National Eligibility cum Entrance Test - Undergraduate (NEET) NEET
National Eligibility Test (CSIR NET) CSR NET
 National Eligibility Test (UGC NET) UGC NET

Controversies and credibility of NTA

2020 JEE Main Assam topper scam 

In 2020 Neel Nakshatra Das, a candidate for JEE Mains used a substitute to give the exam. He subsequently scored 99.8 percentile in the exam and topped in his state, Assam. Seven persons have been arrested including Bhargav Deka, owner of a city-based coaching institute Global Edu Light, Tata Consultancy Services employees, the candidate (Neel Nakshatra Das), Neel's father - Dr. Jyotirmoy Das, and an invigilator.

NEET (U) related 
In NEET (UG) 2020 exam, NTA incorrectly declared that Vidhi Suryavanshi of Madhya Pradesh’s Chhindwara district had only scored 6 marks which were later found out to be false after Vidhi committed suicide. Vidhi's response sheet proved that she had actually scored 590 marks.

In NEET (UG) 2020 exam, NTA had allegedly declared Mridul Rawat as failed. Rawat claimed that he challenged the NTA and after rechecking his OMR sheet and Answer Key, it was found that he is an All India Topper (ST Category). Rawat also claimed that even after the rechecking, in the revised scorecard, his score was 650 but only three hundred twenty-nine were written in words. NTA refuted the claims of Mridul Rawat.  Director-General Vineet Joshi of NTA said “An aspirant has claimed that he has 650 marks whereas he has obtained 329 marks in NEET 2020 results. The emails purported to have been written by NTA are also fake. This news has been broadcast by some local news channels in some cities. This news is totally fake, fabricated, and one-sided and news channels should have confirmed from NTA prior to broadcasting it. In the instant case, a complaint is being filed by NTA with the cybersecurity cell under the IT Act at Noida, UP.”

JEE (Main) 2022 technical issues 
National Testing Agency was widely criticized for the improper conduction of JEE (Main) 2022 examination. Many students faced technical issues during the examination, which resulted in lower score. Glitches in answer key and response sheet of the exam were also a serious problem for the students. The agency has not considered the reconduction of the examination.

Irregularity in level of question papers 
NTA has been criticized of irregularities in the difficulty level of various question papers of JEE (Main), which leads to normalization of marks and ultimately, lower score.

See also

 List of Public service commissions in India

References

External links 
 Official Website

Government agencies established in 2017
2017 establishments in India
School examinations in India